Andrew Bouldin is a New Hampshire politician.

Education
Bouldin graduated from Oyster River High School and New Hampshire Community Technical College.

Professional career
On November 6, 2018, Bouldin was elected to the New Hampshire House of Representatives where he represents the Hillsborough 12 district. Bouldin assumed office on December 5, 2018. Bouldin is a Democrat. Bouldin endorsed Bernie Sanders in the 2020 Democratic Party presidential primaries.

Personal life
Bouldin resides in Manchester, New Hampshire.

References

Living people
Politicians from Manchester, New Hampshire
Democratic Party members of the New Hampshire House of Representatives
21st-century American politicians
Year of birth missing (living people)